Sticherus quadripartitus known locally as yerba loza, palmita, pata de cucho and bi-iúl, is a fern native to Chile with a natural distribution ranging from the latitude of Concepción (~37° S) in the north to Magallanes Region (~55° S) in the south including adjacent parts of Argentina. It is also found in the Juan Fernández Islands. It grows found from sea level up to 1800 m.a.s.l. and occurs in humid areas that are neither shady or too exposed to direct sunlight.

References

 Florachilena.cl

quadripartita
Ferns of Argentina
Ferns of Chile
Flora of the Juan Fernández Islands